Ken Maumalo (born 16 July 1994) is a professional rugby league footballer who plays as a er for the West Tigers in the NRL and has played for Samoa and New Zealand at international level.

He previously played for the New Zealand Warriors in the NRL. He was named Dally M Winger of the Year in 2019.

Background
Maumalo was born in Auckland, New Zealand, and is of Samoan descent, originating from Lalomanu Aileipata. Maumalo attended Southern Cross Campus in South Auckland.

Maumalo is the first cousin of Melbourne Storm prop Nelson Asofa-Solomona.

Playing career

Early years
He played junior football for the Papatoetoe Panthers, Mangere East Hawks and Counties Manukau Stingrays before being signed by the New Zealand Warriors. Maumalo played for New Zealand Residents under-18s in 2012. Maumalo played for the Warriors' NYC team in 2013 and 2014 before moving to the Warriors' New South Wales Cup team in 2015. Maumalo played in the 2014 Holden Cup grand final against the Brisbane Broncos off the interchange bench in the 34-32 victory.

2015
On 16 January 2015, Maumalo was named in the Warriors' 2015 Auckland Nines squad. After impressing in pre-season trials, he was expected to make his NRL debut in round one before being ruled out with a hamstring injury. Maumalo made his NRL debut in round 10 of the 2015 NRL season, against the Parramatta Eels on the wing at Parramatta Stadium.

2016
On 8 October 2016, Maumalo made his International debut for Samoa in their historical test match against Fiji in Apia. He scored two tries in Samoa's 18–20 loss.

2017 
Maumalo admitted he almost finalised a mid-season move to the St George Illawarra Dragons in May last year, before the Warriors blocked it and instead re-signed him through until the end of 2018.

"It was pretty close, my manager was sorting it out and I was about to leave the week before [playing for the Dragons] but then got told to stay," Maumalo said.

2018 
On 10 August 2018, Maumalo ran 208 metres from 22 runs during the Warriors' 18-12 triumph over the St. George Illawarra Dragons.

Maumalo said he needed to focus on his defence due to his poor 68% tackle-efficiency that season. "I feel like just my defensive reads have been a little off next to Sol (centre Solomone Kata). I feel I can really knuckle up on that a bit better and just sticking to my tackles," he said.

2019 
On 19 July 2019, Maumalo was ruled out of Friday night's game against the Cronulla-Sutherland Sharks due to a concussion sustained the previous weekend against the Broncos. He was be replaced by outside back, Blake Ayshford on the wing.

At the conclusion of the 2019 NRL season, Maumalo lead the NRL in post-contact metres with 1,490 and finished in the top 5 for most tries with 17.

2020 
Despite the sacking of Stephen Kearney after the New Zealand Warriors had a streak of poor performances, Maumalo continued his try-scoring form; ending Round 11 with 5 tries from eight games. However, the Warriors' historic stay in Australia took a heavy toll on Maumalo, by means of being away from his family. Hence, Maumalo flew back to New Zealand on 27 July 2020 among other teammates and is not expected to return for the remainder of the 2020 NRL season.

2021
In June 2021, it was announced that Maumalo had signed a two-year deal to join the Wests Tigers.  Maumalo was then granted an immediate switch.  He played his final game for New Zealand in round 14 of the 2021 NRL season where he scored a hat-trick in a 42-16 loss against Melbourne.

Maumalo made his debut for the Wests Tigers in round 15 against Melbourne which ended in a 66-16 defeat.

In round 19, he scored two tries for the Wests Tigers in a 44-24 loss against Manly.
In round 21, he scored another double, this time in a 28-16 victory over Canterbury.

2022
In his first full season with Wests Tigers, Maumalo was named one of five captains of the club, alongside James Tamou, Luke Brooks, Adam Doueihi and Tyrone Peachey. The Sydney Morning Herald said, "Maumolo was seen as the biggest shock inclusion, especially given most fans view him as a softly-spoken winger, but the Tigers have been impressed with how much he has discovered his voice since he joined the club midway through last year." In his first game after, he ran for 122 metres and scored two tries, his third double in 11 games at the club.
In round 11 of the 2022 NRL season, he scored two tries in a 36-22 victory over Canterbury at Leichhardt Oval.
He played a total of 19 matches for the Wests Tigers in the 2022 NRL season and scored 12 tries as the club finished bottom of the table and claimed the Wooden Spoon for the first time.

References

External links
New Zealand Warriors profile
Warriors profile
NRL profile
2017 RLWC profile
https://www.sporty.co.nz/aucklandleague/newsarticle/62325?em=1

1994 births
Living people
Counties Manukau rugby league team players
New Zealand national rugby league team players
New Zealand rugby league players
New Zealand sportspeople of Samoan descent
New Zealand people of Tokelauan descent
New Zealand Warriors players
Papatoetoe Panthers players
Rugby league centres
Rugby league players from Auckland
Rugby league wingers
Samoa national rugby league team players
Wests Tigers players